Mulepen Creek is a stream in the U.S. state of Georgia. It is a tributary to the Ohoopee River.

Mulepen Creek was named for a mule corral near its course. The name sometimes is spelled out as "Mule Pen Creek".

References

Rivers of Georgia (U.S. state)
Rivers of Emanuel County, Georgia
Rivers of Johnson County, Georgia